Crashin' Thru is a 1923 American silent Western film directed by Val Paul and starring Harry Carey. With no copies of Crashin' Thru located in any film archives, it is a lost film.

Cast
 Harry Carey as Blake
 Cullen Landis as Cons Saunders
 Myrtle Stedman as Celia
 Vola Vale as Diane
 Charles Le Moyne as Saunders
 Winifred Bryson as Gracia
 Joe Harris as Holmes (as Joseph Harris)
 Donald MacDonald as Allison
 Charles Hill Mailes as Benedict

See also
 Harry Carey filmography

References

External links
 
 
 

1923 films
1923 Western (genre) films
1923 lost films
American black-and-white films
Film Booking Offices of America films
Films directed by Val Paul
Lost American films
Lost Western (genre) films
Silent American Western (genre) films
1920s American films